Cyathea delgadii is a widespread species of tree fern. It is native to Central America (Costa Rica, Nicaragua and Panama), and much of South America (Colombia, Guyana, Venezuela, Bolivia, Ecuador, Peru, Brazil, including Trindade, Argentina and Paraguay). The specific epithet delgadii refers to Gancho do Generale Delgado, along the road to Caldas Novas, Brazil, where the type material was collected.

Description
The crown is large and slightly arching. The petioles are yellow-brown to dark brown in colouration and bear spines. Small brown scales cover the rachis, which is also brown. Sori are borne on each side of the pinnule midvein and are protected by globose indusia.

Distribution and habitat
It forms part of a large complex centered on Cyathea fulva.

In Costa Rica, C. delgadii is present in the Cordillera de Guanacaste, Cordillera de Tilarán, north slope of the Cordillera Central, the Norte region, Caribbean side of the Cordillera de Talamanca, Fila Costeña, and the Osa Peninsula, where it has an altitudinal distribution of 500–1500 m.

Since it is abundant where it does grow and has such a large natural range, the conservation status of C. delgadii can be equated with the IUCN category "lower risk".

Cultivation
Cyathea delgadii is cultivated as an ornamental tree for gardens.  To do well in cultivation, plants should be provided with consistent moisture and well-drained humus as a substrate. This species does best when sheltered from the wind and grown in a warm area.

The roots of this species are used for the culture of orchids and the manufacture of crafts. C. delgadii may grow on disturbed land and, since it is often harvested from these areas, its use does not have as great an impact on the forest as it would otherwise.

References

External links
Guimarães, Thais de Beauclair & Gil M. Felippe 1999. The survival and establishment potential of spores of Cyathea delgadii Sternb. in soils from Itirapina and Moji Guaçu (SP), Brazil. Rev. bras. Bot. 22(3).

delgadii
Ferns of the Americas
Flora of Costa Rica
Flora of Panama
Flora of Nicaragua
Flora of northern South America
Flora of western South America
Flora of Brazil
Ferns of Argentina
Flora of Paraguay
Garden plants of Central America
Garden plants of South America
Ornamental trees